False or True (also known as FoT) is a children's TV programme broadcast from 1993 to 1996 in the UK on CBBC. Some years later it returned as a completely revised show as part of the Saturday morning show Live & Kicking from 2000 to 2001. Its premise was a series of videos in the style of news reports or features which the viewer had to guess whether they were true or false. Mairi McHaffie & Stephen Caro (also Gordon Inglis in 1993) presented the original 1990s show.

References

See also
Banzai
The Day Today
Brass Eye
The Lowdown (TV series)
Would I Lie to You? (TV series)
Call My Bluff

BBC children's television shows
1990s British children's television series